Carl Leslie Thomas (May 28, 1932 – March 7, 2013) was a former Major League Baseball pitcher who played for one season. He pitched in four games for the Cleveland Indians during the 1960 season. He won a silver medal with the United States team at the 1955 Pan American Games.

In his only decision, Thomas won his last Major League game, on May 14, 1960, against the Chicago White Sox. Although he allowed five hits and five earned runs in 4⅓ innings pitched of relief, he was credited with the 10–9 victory.

References

External links

1932 births
2013 deaths
All-American college baseball players
Arizona Wildcats baseball players
Major League Baseball pitchers
Cleveland Indians players
San Diego Padres (minor league) players
Indianapolis Indians players
Baseball players from Minneapolis
Baseball players at the 1955 Pan American Games
Pan American Games silver medalists for the United States
Pan American Games medalists in baseball
Nashville Vols players
Medalists at the 1955 Pan American Games
Mobile Bears players